Marcus Rolf Börje Nilson (born March 1, 1978) is a Swedish former professional ice hockey player, who played in the National Hockey League (NHL) with the Florida Panthers and Calgary Flames.

Playing career
Nilson was drafted in the first round, 20th overall, by the Florida Panthers in the 1996 NHL Entry Draft. His hockey style is quite adverse from the typical style of Swedish hockey players. His grit and intensity, especially among the boards, earned him the role of a dependable checker with the ability to add the odd goal/assist.

A talent of Djurgårdens IF in Sweden, Nilson moved to North America in 1998 and played most of his first two years in the American Hockey League.

After three full seasons with the Panthers, he was traded to the Calgary Flames on March 8, 2004, for a second round draft pick (used to select David Booth). In his first opportunity to play in the Stanley Cup playoffs, Nilson reached the finals and recorded 11 points in 26 playoffs games. He would play for three more years with Calgary.

In the summer of 2008, the Flames placed Nilson on waivers and after clearing without being claimed by another club, he was loaned to Lokomotiv Yaroslavl of the Kontinental Hockey League (KHL) for the season. Nilson returned to Djurgården for the 2009–10 season, signing a one-year contract. He led his team to the playoffs after scoring 24 goals and 51 points. Nilson kept producing points during the playoffs and Djurgården reached the finals against HV71, which they lost four games to two.

Nilson played with the New Jersey Devils on a try-out contract in September 2010, but was ultimately not offered a contract to play the season.

Career statistics

Regular season and playoffs

International

References

External links

1978 births
Beast of New Haven players
Calgary Flames players
Djurgårdens IF Hockey players
Expatriate ice hockey players in Russia
Florida Panthers draft picks
Florida Panthers players
HV71 players
Louisville Panthers players
Living people
Lokomotiv Yaroslavl players
National Hockey League first-round draft picks
People from Håbo Municipality
Swedish expatriate ice hockey players in Canada
Swedish expatriate sportspeople in Russia
Swedish expatriate ice hockey players in the United States
Swedish ice hockey left wingers
Sportspeople from Uppsala County